Geomam station is a railway station on AREX and Incheon Subway Line 2.  Since June 2014, the KTX train operates from Incheon International Airport to Busan or Mokpo. It has stopped operating KTX since March 2018. In September 2018, Korail officially announced that they would stop operating KTX to Incheon International Airport due to lack of passenger use. This was the first KTX station after Incheon Airport. Before KTX started to run on AREX, all platforms were high-leveled with screen doors. The KTX started to run, they took away the platform screen doors only at the both end of the side horizontally and turned into low-leveled platform without screen doors.

Vicinity
 Korail Airport Railroad Corporation headquarters
 SeoIncheon High School
 Geomam Elementary School
 Geomam-sageori (4-way junction)

External links

Metro stations in Incheon
Seo District, Incheon
Railway stations opened in 2007
Seoul Metropolitan Subway stations